Thanatology is the scientific study of death and the losses brought about as a result. It investigates the mechanisms and forensic aspects of death, such as bodily changes that accompany death and the postmortem period, as well as wider psychological and social aspects related to death. It is primarily an interdisciplinary study offered as a course of study at numerous colleges and universities.

The word is derived from the Greek language. In Greek mythology, Thanatos (: "death") is the personification of death. The English suffix -ology derives from the Greek suffix -logia (: "speaking").

History 
Russian scientist Élie Metchnikoff was famous for his work in microbiology and the discovery of phagocytosis. "Phagocytosis is the process by which a celloften a phagocyte or protistengulfs a solid particle to form an internal compartment known as a phagosome."  In 1903, he established a scientific discipline devoted to the study of death. He argued that those who were dying had few or no resources for the experience of dying and that an academic study would help those facing death to have a better understanding of the phenomenon and reduce their fear of it.

Metchnikoff based his ideas for an interdisciplinary study on the fact that while medical students had their obligatory encounters with cadavers through anatomical studies, there was almost no instruction on how to care for the dying, nor was there any research into death included in the curriculum. Because few scholars and educators agreed with Metchnikoff, the support he needed for the realization of his suggestion did not materialize for decades.

Metchnikoff chose to focus on two new areas of study, gerontology and thanatology. Contrary to gerontology, it took about 47 years for most people to accept thanatology as a science. Therefore, the science of thanatology is fairly new for the most part. The altered viewpoints people developed when it came to viewing and coping with death was one reason that thanatology became more accepted across societies.

Thanatology arose with the 'Death with Dignity' movement of the early 1970s as an interdisciplinary category for the study of death. The Death with Dignity movement allows Americans to decide what happens to their cadaver after death.

Following World War II, the world was haunted with the memories of the many casualties.  During this period of reflection many existential philosophers began considering life-and-death issues.  One in particular was Herman Feifel, an American psychologist who is considered the pioneer of the modern death movement.  Feifel broke the taboo on discussions of death and dying with the publication of his book The Meaning of Death.  In this book, Feifel dispelled myths held by scientists and practitioners about death and the denial of its importance for human behavior.  It earned wide attention and became a classic in the new field, including as it did contributions from eminent thinkers such as psychiatrist Carl Jung, theologian Paul Tillich and philosopher Herbert Marcuse. Through The Meaning of Death, Feifel was able to lay the foundation for a field that would eventually be known as Thanatology.  The field was to improve death education and grief counselling by the use of valid death-related data, methodology and theory.

However, this is only one of several important books in the field of thanatology. Other key texts include The Experience of Death by Paul-Louis Landsberg, the sections on temporality and death from Martin Heidegger's Being and Time, as well as works of a fictional nature, such as Leo Tolstoy's The Death of Ivan Ilyich and As I Lay Dying by William Faulkner.

Goals 
In most cases, thanatology is not specifically related to palliative care and end-of-life care, which aim to provide treatment for dying individuals and their families.  According to the World Health Organization, "palliative care is an approach that improves the quality of life of patients and their families facing the problem associated with life-threatening illness, involving the 'treatment of pain and other problems, physical, psychosocial and spiritual.'"

Thanatology does not always directly explore the meaning of life and of death, though such questions are relevant to the psychological health of those involved in the dying process: individuals, families, communities, and cultures.

As a consequence of thanatology becoming so prominent, there has been an increase in university education surrounding death, including courses and degree programs in thanatology. A continuing goal of this science is to improve the communication between practice and research since that is something that has been lacking. Thanatology has come a long way and will keep evolving to better our understanding of death. Highly regarded certification programs are also available.

Forensic science 
Forensic science deals with, among many other things, sudden and unexpected deaths. According to one author: "Forensic medicine is the application of medical knowledge for the scientific investigation of facts and causal relationships, as well as the analysis and interpretation thereof in the service of the law in its broadest sense; moreover, it addresses all legal aspects of the practice of medicine during teaching, medical training, and specialist training." The process of postmortem autopsy, which originated and is well established in modern Europe has not been adopted universally, however. A large portion of a forensic physician's duty is to assist in inquiries into sudden and suspicious deaths and to examine individuals in connections with allegations of sexual offenses. They also provide expert evidence in court but the notion that they represent individuals in court proceedings reveals a misconception of their role. Legal representation is invariably the province of legally qualified advocates and in many jurisdictions, the right of audience as an advocate is confined by law to those so qualified.

Physicians' rules for forensic science: Any natural scientist who wishes to practice forensic science must obviously acquire forensic knowledge. Not all forensic scientists, however, are medically qualified and nor do medical practitioners have a monopoly in forensic science.

There are a handful of forensic doctors who work closely with prisoners to provide them with clinical assessments. They also put together care plans moving forward with these prisoners. These plans can include prescribing and obtaining medicine and monitoring them from a physical and mental health perspective.

Coping with death

Research and studies 
Multiple scholarly journals dedicated specifically to thanatology regularly publish peer-reviewed studies and essays of interest in the field. These include Death Studies, Mortality, Omega:Journal of Death & Dying, Journal of Loss & Trauma, and Illness, Crisis, & Loss. Though Elisabeth Kübler-Ross described five stages of grief with terminal illness (denial, anger, bargaining, depression, and acceptance), some thanatologists disagree about the actual existence of such stages. Some reject the notion as simplistic and empirically unsupported.

Studies show that if one's self-esteem is already  low, the death of one's partner may well result in greater social and emotional loneliness (concepts defined specifically by the researchers). Aggravated social and emotional  loneliness, as thus defined, may result in a feeling of having  received less support. However, since an imperfect grasp of these findings may lead to a garbled attempt to describe them, it is desirable to read them fully in their original sources so as to master them as thoroughly as one assimilates Kübler-Ross' theories of responses to loss.

Mortality awareness may be thought essential to our overall well-being as we confront the aging of world societies, global health disparities, emerging biomedical technologies, and shifting understandings of good deaths and lives worth living. However, we must be clear about what we mean by 'mortality awareness'. It is often said, and with some justification, that one phenomenon that distinguishes humans from other evolved beings is our acute awareness of our own mortality. If we mean no more than that we must know we must die in order to flourish, the assertion is facile since most humans are conscious of their mortality but we do not all rise equally well to existential or wider social challenges.

Hospice care

One way to cope with death is to utilize hospice care facilities. Hospice care of dying people is usually palliative rather than curative, and it may ease the suffering of the dying and those who care about them. The services provided in a hospice include: managing the dying individual's pain and symptoms; providing needed drugs, medical supplies and equipment; assisting the individual with emotional, psychological and spiritual aspects of dying; rendering services such as speech and physiotherapy where needed; and coaching family and friends on how to care for the individual.

A common myth about hospice care is that someone must be in their last few days of life, be bedridden or be unable to communicate with others to receive hospice help. However, that is simply not the case. Hospice care is appropriate for those who have been given a prognosis that they are likely to die within around 12 months or less. A decision to use hospice care means the dying individual will ideally spend more quality time with the people they love and have time to look back on life during this peaceful, meaningful period.

Another common myth is that hospice care means giving up hope. Hospice involves coping with death and part of that means acknowledging that some diseases, illnesses and states of being in their advanced stages cannot be cured. The idea of hope varies from person to person and, in hospice care, patients and their loved ones will often seek any form of hope that they can.

However, in places where there is little or no publicly funded provision, various private insurance plans such as Medicare, Medicaid, and HMO will take care of the costs of hospice care, reducing direct expense for the individual's family.

Popular media

Death and dying was the subject of the 2018 Academy Award-nominated Netflix short documentary, End Game about terminally ill patients in palliative care at a San Francisco hospital and subsequent Hospice care. It featured palliative care physician, BJ Miller and was executive produced by palliative care activist  Dr. Shoshana R. Ungerleider.

An episode of Quincy, M.E. titled "Gentle into That Good Night" (season 07 episode 07) featured a Thanatologist by the name of Dr. Pendelton. During the episode Dr. Quincy explores the effect of death on people and his role in the grieving process.

Fields of study 
As an interdisciplinary study, thanatology relies on collaboration with many different fields of study. Death is a universal human concern; it has been examined and re-examined in a wide variety of disciplines, dating back to pre-history. Some of these fields of study are academic in nature; others have evolved throughout history as cultural traditions. One of the oldest organizations in the field of thanatology is the U.S.-based Association for Death Education and Counseling

The humanities are, perhaps, the very oldest disciplines to explore death. Historically, the average human had a significantly lower standard of living and lifespan than they would today. Wars, famine, and disease always kept death close at hand. Artists, authors, and poets often employed the universality of death as a motif in their works; this trend continues today.

The social sciences are often involved on both the individual and the cultural level. The individual level is primarily covered by psychology, the study of individual minds. However, to overlook social psychology would be a serious omission. Avoiding (or, in some cases, seeking) death is an important human motive; the fear of death affects many individuals' actions. That fear can be either reinforced or assuaged by social culture.

Social science research has frequently encountered the issue of death. The subject-matter of Sociology, for instance, extends to but is by no means confined to social rules, conventions and practices. Sub-disciplines within sociology, such as the sociology of death and sociology of disaster, focus more narrowly on such issues as how societies handle death under certain conditions. Likewise, cultural anthropology and archeology are concerned with how various current and past cultures have each dealt with death. Society and culture are related but dissimilar concepts, so the scope of each is different. Thus, a society is an interdependent community, while societal as distinct from individual culture is an attribute of a community, including the complex web of shifting patterns that links some individuals together. In any case, both cultures and societies must deal with death; and various cultural studies (many of which overlap with each other) examine this response taking a variety of approaches.

Thanatology is by no means reducible to a section of forensic science and the notion that it can be is symptomatic of the pathological urge of scientism  to force all disciplines into its own Procrustean bed. The biological study of death helps explain what happens, physically, to individuals in the moment of dying and during after-death bodily changes, so that extraneous events at the time of death and thereafter can be clarified. In psychiatry and clinical psychology the medical application of psychological principles and therapeutic drugs is also involved; many licensed psychiatrists are required to take courses on thanatology during training. Medical ethics is also an important area of study, especially on the issue of euthanasia ('merciful killing') and assisted suicide. But the degree to which any of these is an aspect of thanatology is a matter of opinion depending primarily on how one defines thanatology itself.

There is also a branch of thanatology called music thanatology which focuses on the use of "music vigils" to help dying individuals, their families and friends. A vigil consists of one or a team of music thanatologists who visit the dying person. They play the harp most often but can be any gentle instrument like the guitar and sing music based on changes that they observe in that person's physiology as well as in interpersonal family dynamics. The music tends toward the meditative, and can be very helpful to the dying person and others present. (However, in the nature of things, appreciative or even disparaging reviews of the service by recipients are few and far between.) Some music thanatologists are certified by the Music Thanatology Association International, and they use the initials "CM-Th" to designate certification by this professional organization. A number of hospitals and hospices now have professional music thanatologists on their staff.

See also
 Association for Death Education and Counseling
 Fascination with death
 Taboo against naming the dead
 Thanatopsis
 Thanatosensitivity
 Thanatos

References

External links
 

 
Medical aspects of death
Thanatos